Jack Doherty (born 1948, Coleraine) is a Northern Irish studio potter and author. He is perhaps best known for his vessels made of soda-fired porcelain. He has been featured in a number of books, and his work has been exhibited widely in both Europe and North America. Articles of his have appeared in various pottery journals and he has been Chair of the Craft Potters Association.

Biography
Upon graduating from the Ulster College of Art and Design in 1971, Jack Doherty began working as a studio potter at Kilkenny Design Workshops, Ireland. Afterwards, he established his studio first in Co Armagh and then in Herefordshire, while also being a part-time lecturer in ceramics at the Royal Forest of Dean College. He was elected as chair of the Craft Potters Association between 1995 and 2000 and again between 2002 and 2008. He was lead potter and creative director at the Leach Pottery in St. Ives, Cornwall, where he developed Leach's new range of contemporary tableware. In 2012, Doherty exhibited alongside Japanese potter Tomoo Hamada, celebrating the signing of an official declaration of friendship between the towns of St. Ives and Mashiko, Tochigi, Japan, by the two respective mayors on 20 September 2012. As a founder he became the current Chair of the organising committee of Ceramic Arts London in 2013, previously being director of both Ceramic Review magazine and Contemporary Ceramics for more than 13 years. He now works independently from his studio in Mousehole, Cornwall, England. He was visited by Rick Stein in the first series of the BBC's Rick Stein's Cornwall.

Work process
Devoting the majority of his career to porcelain, Doherty has developed a unique process of crafting his ceramic objects. The shapes are thrown, then carved and shaped using only one type of porcelain clay. One slip in which copper carbonate is added as a colouring material is applied. Finally, he uses a single soda-firing technique, executed by spraying a mixture of water and sodium bicarbonate into the kiln at a high temperature. The resulting vapour is drawn through the kiln chamber where it reacts with the silica and alumina present in the clay, creating a rich patina of surface texture and colour.

Questioning the vernacular of functionality
Doherty's work is meant to subtly interconnect with domestic space and daily life, and according to Doherty, "can be solitary and contemplative or ceremonial; for everyday use or for special occasions." His recent work displays a sense of robustness, lacking the refined transparent glaze commonly associated with porcelain objects. In using the soda-firing finish and a wide range of archetypal forms, Doherty attempts to question the vernacular of functionality. The vessels Doherty creates explore ancient layers of cultural resonance embedded in these archetypal forms. Looking at the rustic surface textures, the palettes of smoky and sometimes vibrant colours and the simplicity of the irregular shapes thrown by Doherty, the vessels exhume transient visceral qualities reminiscent of the Japanese aesthetics of Wabi-sabi and Shibui, no doubt having been influenced by the work of the late modernist Bernard Leach (Doherty being the previous lead potter of The Leach Pottery), as well as the politics of work as laid out by John Ruskin. Vernacularism as a cultural phenomenon thus plays a large part in the work of Doherty, and it can, therefore, be seen as a product of the Arts and Crafts movement and, associated with it, the writings of William Morris.

Selected awards
 2009 The Crafts Council of Ireland Bursary Award
 2007 Seeded, Sculpture in Context Award Winner
 2006 Borderland, Cast Award, Sculpture in Context
 1998 1st Prize West Midlands Arts Touring Exhibition
 1993 West Midlands Arts Crafts initiative grant
 1986 Crafts Council marketing / publicity grant
 1976 Gold Medal International Ceramics Biennial, Vallauris, France
 1974 Gold Medal International Ceramics Exhibition, Faenza, Italy

Selected exhibitions

Solo exhibitions
 2012 Jack Doherty and Tomoo Hamada, Gallery St Ives, Tokyo, Japan
 2012 A Place In The World, Garden House, Cornwall, United Kingdom
 2010 Solo Exhibition, National Taipei University of Education, Taiwan

Group exhibitions and fairs
 2013 Future Beauty?, National Craft Gallery, Kilkenny, Ireland
 2012 The Ethics of Objects, Kinsale Arts Festival, Co. Cork, Vessels, Cill Rialaig Arts Centre, Co. Kerry, Irish Craft Portfolio, RHA, Dublin, Ceramic Art London, Royal College of Art, London, United Kingdom
 2011 Talking in Clay, Courtyard Arts Centre, Hereford, United Kingdom, Art Fair Tokyo, Japan, Irish Craft Portfolio, RHA, Dublin, transFORM, Farmleigh Gallery, Dublin and Millennium Court Arts Centre, Co. Armagh, COLLECT, Saatchi Gallery, London, United Kingdom, Irish Craft Portfolio, National Craft Gallery, Kilkenny, A Place in the World, Newlyn Art Gallery, Cornwall, UK, Through Fifty, CCC, London, UK
 2010 Tea Ceremony Pots, Mitzukoshi Gallery, Tokyo, Japan, European Ceramics Context, Denmark

Collections
 National Museum of Ireland
 Museum of Liverpool, United Kingdom
 Cheltenham Art Gallery & Museum, United Kingdom
 Princessehof Ceramics Museum, Netherlands
 The Potteries Museum & Art Gallery, Stoke-on-Trent, United Kingdom

Publications
 Porcelain by Jack Doherty, published by University of Pennsylvania Press, 2002,

Articles and references in other publications
 2013  "Troubled Light", Eleanor Flegg, Ceramic Review
 2012  "Talking Quietly Hearing Silence", Eleanor Flegg, Craft Arts International
 2011 "The Craft and Art of Clay", Susan Peterson
 2010  "Jack Doherty", Interiors Magazine, Taiwan, "Jack Doherty Pure Simplicity", Ceramics Art Magazine, Taiwan, "Jack Doherty", China Post, Taiwan, "Accidentally on Purpose", Taipei Times Taiwan
 2009  Ceramics Ireland, Tina Byrne, "Jack Doherty", Eleanor Flegg, Perspectives
 2008 "Brightness and Rightness", Helen Bevis, Ceramics Monthly
 2007 "Revelations", David Whiting, Ceramics Art and Perception
 2006 "The Ceramics Book", Ceramic Review
 2005 "The Teapot Book", Steve Woodhead, A&C Black
 2004 "Contemporary Porcelain", Peter Lane, A&C Black, "Porcelain and Bone China", Sasha Wardell, Crowood Press
 2003 "The Ceramic Surface", Osterman, A&C Black, National Ceramics, South Africa, "Complete Potters Companion", Tony Birks, Conran Octopus
 2002 Ceramics Ireland, "Salt Glazed Ceramics", Phil Rogers, A&C Black
 2001 "Salt-Glaze Ceramics", Rosemary Cochrane, Crowood Press
 2000 "Ten Thousand Years of Pottery", Emmanuel Cooper, British Museum
 1999 "Reputations", Anatol Orient, Ceramic Review
 1998 "A Song of Today", Josie Walter, Ceramic Review
 1995 "Colouring Clay", Clay Times, Washington DC
 1994 "Porcelain", Caroline Whyman, Batsford
 1993 "Soda Glazing", Ruthanne Tudball, A&C Black
 1992 "Potters", Craft Potters Association
 1991 "Dictionary of Practical Pottery" Robert Fournier
 1990 "Colour in Clay", Jane Waller, Crowood Press
 1989 "Potters Dictionary of Techniques and Materials", Hamer, A&C Black
 1983 "Jack Doherty's Porcelain", Ceramic Review
 1983 "Making a Tradition",  Sean McCrum, Irish Times
 1982 "The Crafts in Ulster", Peter Dormer, Crafts Magazine

References

External links
 Official website
 Design & Crafts Council of Ireland: Irish Craft Portfolio - Jack Doherty

1948 births
Living people
Artists from Northern Ireland
British potters
People from Coleraine, County Londonderry
St Ives artists